Seyyed Yusef (also Romanized as Seyyed Yūsef and Seyyed Yūsof; also known as Seyyed Yūsol) is a village in Mosharrahat Rural District, in the Central District of Ahvaz County, Khuzestan Province, Iran. At the 2006 census, its population was 66, in 15 families.

References 

Populated places in Ahvaz County